Tolnaodes is a monotypic moth genus of the family Noctuidae erected by George Hampson in 1913. Its only species, Tolnaodes dasynota, was first described by Felder in 1874. It is found in French Guiana.

Subspecies
Tolnaodes dasynota calocraspeda Prout, 1919

References

Catocalinae
Monotypic moth genera